Forward Seamen's Union of India is a trade union, affiliated to the Centre of Indian Trade Unions, organizing Indian sailors.

External links

References

Trade unions in India
Centre of Indian Trade Unions
Seafarers' trade unions